Paul Valcke (11 January 1914 – 15 July 1980) was a Belgian fencer. He won a bronze medal in the team foil event at the 1948 Summer Olympics.

References

1914 births
1980 deaths
Belgian male fencers
Olympic fencers of Belgium
Fencers at the 1936 Summer Olympics
Fencers at the 1948 Summer Olympics
Fencers at the 1952 Summer Olympics
Olympic bronze medalists for Belgium
Olympic medalists in fencing
Sportspeople from Ostend
Medalists at the 1948 Summer Olympics